Tsai Ding Hsin (December 10, 1920 – January 20, 2015) was a Chinese calligraphy master,  artist and poet of classical Chinese poetry in Taiwan.

References

1920 births
2015 deaths
Republic of China calligraphers
Republic of China poets
Taiwanese calligraphers
Taiwanese poets
Artists from Fuzhou
Writers from Fuzhou
Poets from Fujian
20th-century poets